...Waiting on You was the only album released by the British folk rock band Jonathan Kelly's Outside. The album was released in 1974.

Track listing
All songs by Jonathan Kelly
"Misery" – 6:25
"Making It Lonely" – 4:55
"Tempest" – 6:21
"Sensation Street" – 6:00
"Great Northern Railroad" – 8:00
"I'll Never Find Another Love" – 4:22
"Yesterday's Promises" – 3:53
"Tell Me People" – 8:42

Personnel
Jonathan Kelly's Outside
Jonathan Kelly – vocals, guitar, piano
Snowy White – lead guitar
Trevor Williams – bass
Dave Sheen – drums, percussion
Additional personnel
Chas Jankel – lead guitar (tracks 4, 7, 8)
Peter Wood – piano (track 5)
Max Middleton – clavinet (track 1)
Ron Carthy – trumpet (tracks 3, 8)
Mick Eve – saxophone (tracks 3, 8)
Chris Mercer – saxophone (tracks 3, 8)
Smiley DeJonnes – congas (tracks 3, 4, 6)

Production
Jonathan Kelly: producer
Brian Humphries: engineer
Jak Kilby: cover photo
Tim Staffell: album design

1974 debut albums
Jonathan Kelly albums
RCA Records albums